is a Kōya-san Shingon temple in Awa, Tokushima Prefecture, Japan. Temple 8 on the Shikoku 88 temple pilgrimage, the main image is of Senjū Kannon. The temple is said to have been founded by Kōbō Daishi. The Hondō was destroyed by fire in 1928 and has been rebuilt. The Daishidō, tahōtō, chūmon, and shōrō have all been designated Prefectural Cultural Properties.

See also

 Shikoku 88 temple pilgrimage

References

Buddhist pilgrimage sites in Japan
Buddhist temples in Tokushima Prefecture
Kōyasan Shingon temples